El Cajon Valley High School (ECVHS) is a comprehensive public secondary school located in El Cajon, California, which is in the eastern county of San Diego, and serves students in grades nine through twelve. Established in 1955, El Cajon Valley is the third of twelve high schools to be built in the Grossmont Union High School District. ECVHS is the home of the Braves.

El Cajon Valley High school is accredited by the Western Association of Schools and Colleges (WASC).

Extracurricular activities
Athletics

El Cajon Valley's athletic teams, the Braves, compete in the Valley League of the Grossmont Conference and the California Interscholastic Federation (CIF) – San Diego Section.

The school fields teams in the following sports: baseball, basketball, cross country, field hockey, football, gymnastics, soccer, softball, swimming, boys tennis, girls tennis, track & field, boys volleyball, girls volleyball, boys water polo, girls water polo, and wrestling.

Additional extracurricular activities can be found on the El Cajon Valley High School website

Notable alumni
 Lester Bangs (music critic).
 Mike Davis (Marxist historian)
 Bob Christian, Former professional baseball player (Detroit Tigers, Chicago White Sox)
 Mike Hartley, Former professional baseball player (Los Angeles Dodgers, Philadelphia Phillies, Minnesota Twins, Boston Red Sox, Baltimore Orioles)
 Joe Kennedy, Former professional baseball player (Tampa Bay Rays, Colorado Rockies, Oakland Athletics, Arizona Diamondbacks, Toronto Blue Jays)
 Mark Malone, Former professional football player (Arizona State, Pittsburgh Steelers, San Diego Chargers)
 James Wong, Writer/Director of Final Destination film series.

See also

List of high schools in San Diego County, California
List of high schools in California

References

External links
 

Educational institutions established in 1955
High schools in San Diego County, California
Public high schools in California
Education in El Cajon, California
1955 establishments in California